Green Mount Cemetery is a historic rural cemetery in Baltimore, Maryland, United States. Established on March 15, 1838, and dedicated on July 13, 1839, it is noted for the large number of historical figures interred in its grounds as well as many prominent Baltimore-area families. It retained the name Green Mount when the land was purchased from the heirs of Baltimore merchant Robert Oliver. Green Mount is a treasury of precious works of art, including striking works by major sculptors including William H. Rinehart and Hans Schuler.

The cemetery was listed in the National Register of Historic Places in 1980. Guided tours are available at various times of the year.

A Baltimore City Landmark plaque at the entrance reads:

In addition to John Wilkes Booth, two other conspirators in the assassination of Abraham Lincoln are buried here, Samuel Arnold and Michael O'Laughlen. It is common for visitors to the cemetery to leave pennies on the graves of the three men; the one-cent coin features the likeness of the president they successfully sought to murder.

The abdicated King Edward VIII and his wife, the Duchess of Windsor, had planned for a burial in a purchased plot in Rose Circle at Green Mount Cemetery, near where the father of the Duchess was interred. However, in 1965 an agreement with Queen Elizabeth II allowed for the king and duchess to be buried near other members of the royal family in the Royal Burial Ground near Windsor Castle.

Notable interments

Arunah Abell (1808–1888), journalist, newspaper publisher, founder of the Philadelphia Public Ledger and Baltimore Sun newspapers.
William Julian Albert (1816–1879), U.S. Congressman.
James J. Archer (1860–1921), American politician
Samuel Arnold (1834–1906), Lincoln assassination conspirator.
James Bankhead (1783–1856), U. S. Army General that served in the War of 1812, Second Seminole War, and Mexican–American War.
Robert T. Banks (1822–1901), Mayor of Baltimore
Daniel Moreau Barringer (1806–1873), a United States Congressman and diplomat.
James Lawrence Bartol (1813–1887), American jurist
Joseph Colt Bloodgood (1867–1935), American surgeon
A. Aubrey Bodine (1906–1970), photographer.
Elizabeth ("Betsy") Patterson Bonaparte (1785–1879), Baltimore-born wife of Napoleon's brother, Jérôme Bonaparte (m. 1803). Napoleon refused to recognize the marriage. When Jérôme returned to France in 1805, his wife was forbidden to debark and went to England, where her son, Jérôme Napoléon Bonaparte, was born. Napoleon issued a state decree of annulment for his brother in 1806, and Elizabeth Patterson returned to Baltimore with her son.
 Carroll Bond (1873–1943), American jurist
Elijah Bond, (1847–1921), lawyer and inventor.
Asia Frigga (Booth) Clarke, (1835–1888), author and sister of John Wilkes Booth.
John Wilkes Booth (1838–1865), assassin of President Abraham Lincoln.
Junius Brutus Booth (1796–1852), noted English actor, the foremost tragedian of the early-to-mid 19th century.
Augustus Bradford (1806–1881), Governor of Maryland.
Joseph Lancaster Brent (1826 – 1905) lawyer and politician in California, Louisiana and Maryland and a brigadier general in the Confederate army.
Jesse D. Bright (1812–1875), United States Senator from Indiana.
Nathan C. Brooks (1809–1898), American educator, historian and poet
Frank Brown (1846–1920), Governor of Maryland.
James M. Buchanan (1803–1876), Judge and United States Ambassador to Denmark.
James Buck (1808–1865), an American Civil War Medal of Honor recipient.
John Archibald Campbell (1811–1889), was a United States Supreme Court Justice.
John Lee Chapman (1811–1880), Mayor of Baltimore, glass maker, railroad executive.
George Colton (1817–1898), member of the Maryland House of Delegates
Henry Winter Davis (1817–1865), U.S. Congressman for Maryland's 3rd District, 1863–1865.
William Daniel, state legislator and Prohibition Party vice presidential candidate, 1884.
Allen Welsh Dulles (1893–1969), director of the Central Intelligence Agency and a member of the Warren Commission.
Wendell E. Dunn (1894–1965), educator and principal of Forest Park High School.
Wendell E. Dunn, Jr. (1922–2007), metallurgist and chemical engineer.
Thomas Dunn (1925–2008), musician and conductor.
Johnny Eck (1911–1991), American freak show performer born without legs.
Arnold Elzey (1816–1871), Confederate Civil War general from Maryland.
George F. Emmons (1811–1884), Rear Admiral, United States Navy.
D. Hopper Emory (1841–1916), Maryland state senator
George Hyde Fallon (1902–1980), U.S. Congressman, 4th District of Maryland.
Henry D. Farnandis (1817–1900), Maryland state politician and lawyer
Charles W. Field (1857–1917), Maryland state delegate
Elizabeth Gault Fisher (1909–2000),  entomologist, bacteriologist, and bryologist.
Richard Fuller (1804–1876), Baptist minister and founder of the Southern Baptist movement
William H. B. Fusselbaugh, member of the Maryland House of Delegates
George M. Gill (1803–1887), American lawyer
James Hall (1802–1889), founder of Maryland-in-Africa
Robert G. Harper (1765–1825), United States Senator from Maryland.
Solomon Hillen Jr. (1810–1873), Mayor of Baltimore, U.S. Representative from Maryland, member of the Maryland House of Delegates
Johns Hopkins (1795–1873), businessman and philanthropist. He left substantial bequests in his will to found the Johns Hopkins University and Johns Hopkins Hospital.
Benjamin Chew Howard (1791–1872), a congressman and the fifth reporter of decisions of the United States Supreme Court
Benjamin Huger (1805–1877), a career United States Army ordnance officer and a Confederate general in the American Civil War.
Jesse Hunt (1793–1872), mayor of Baltimore, Maryland
Obed Hussey (1792-1860), American inventor and rival of Cyrus McCormick.
Henry Barton Jacobs (1858–1939), American physician and educator
John Hanson Thomas Jerome (1816–1863), Mayor of Baltimore
Reverdy Johnson (1796–1876), statesman, United States Senator and United States Attorney General.
Joseph Eggleston Johnston (1807–1891), military officer in the Confederate States Army during the American Civil War.
Isaac Dashiell Jones (1806–1893), U.S. Congressman
Anthony Kennedy (1810–1892), United States Senator.
John P. Kennedy (1795–1870), congressman and United States Secretary of the Navy.
Harriet Lane (1830–1903), niece of President James Buchanan, acted as First Lady of the United States from 1857 to 1861.
Sidney Lanier (1842–1881), musician and poet.
Benjamin Henry Latrobe, Jr. (1806–1878), civil engineer and Green Mount's landscape architect.
Ferdinand Claiborne Latrobe (1833–1911), Mayor of Baltimore and speaker of the Maryland House of Delegates
John H. B. Latrobe (1803–1891), American lawyer and inventor
James O. Law (1809–1847), Mayor of Baltimore and merchant
Walter Lord (1917–2002), author, best known for his book on the sinking of the RMS Titanic, A Night to Remember.
John Gresham Machen (1881–1937), influential Presbyterian theologian and founder of Westminster Theological Seminary in Philadelphia, Pennsylvania.
John MacTavish (1787–1852), British Consul to Maryland in the 1840s.
Charles Marshall (1830–1902), colonel in the Confederate States Army, aide de camp, assistant adjutant general, and military secretary for the Army of Northern Virginia and Gen. Robert E. Lee.
Theodore R. McKeldin (1900–1974), Mayor of Baltimore and Governor of Maryland.
Louis McLane (1786–1857), United States Congressman from Delaware, United States Secretary of the Treasury, and later the United States Secretary of State.
Robert Milligan McLane (1815–1898), Governor of Maryland.
Louis Wardlaw Miles (1873–1944), World War I Medal of Honor Recipient.
 Arthur C. Needles (1867-1936), president of the Norfolk and Western Railroad.
John Nelson (1794–1860), United States Attorney General.
Benjamin Franklin Newcomer (1827–1901), railroad executive and bank president
Harry W. Nice (1877–1941), Governor of Maryland.
Daniel S. Norton (1829–1870), United States Senator from Minnesota.
Michael O'Laughlen (1840–1867), Lincoln assassination conspirator.
Enoch Pratt (1808-1896), businessman and philanthropist, founder of Baltimore's public library system and co-founder of the Sheppard Pratt Hospital.
James H. Preston (1860–1938), 35th Mayor of Baltimore.
James R. Price (1862–1929), American sports journalist and executive.
Edward Coote Pinkney (1802–1828), poet.
John P. Poe, Sr. (1836–1909), Attorney General of Maryland, 1891–1895.
Isaac Freeman Rasin (1833–1907), Baltimore politician and political boss
William Henry Rinehart (1825–1874), sculptor
Cadwalader Ringgold (1802–1867), U.S. Navy officer.
Albert C. Ritchie (1876–1936), Governor of Maryland, 1920–1935.
Winford Henry Smith (1877–1961), American physician
William Wallace Spence (1815–1915), financier from Baltimore
Major General George H. Steuart (1790–1867), a United States Army general in the War of 1812.
George H. Steuart (1828–1903), a Confederate general in the American Civil War.
Thomas Swann (1809–1883), Governor of Maryland, 1866–1869, U.S. Congressman for Maryland's 3rd and 4th Districts, 1869–1879, Mayor of Baltimore, 1856–1860.
Joseph Pembroke Thom (1828–1899), member of the Maryland House of Delegates, military officer in the Mexican–American War and Confederate States Army
Isaac R. Trimble (1802–1888), a U.S. Army officer, civil engineer, a prominent railroad construction superintendent and executive, and a Confederate general in the American Civil War.
Daniel Turner (1794–1850), United States Navy officer during the War of 1812.
Erastus B. Tyler (1822–1891), Union Army general in the American Civil War.
Martha Ellicott Tyson (1795–1873), Quaker elder, author, and co-founder of Swarthmore College
John B. Van Meter (1842–1930) U.S. Navy chaplain, academic, and co-founder of Goucher College
Joshua Van Sant (1803–1884), Mayor of Baltimore
John Carroll Walsh (1816–1894), state senator
Henry Walters (1848–1931), president of the Atlantic Coast Line Railroad, art collector whose bequest to the City of Baltimore in 1931 started the Walters Art Museum.
William Thompson Walters (1820–1894), Liquor distributor, banker, railroad magnate and art collector.
Teackle Wallis Warfield  (1869-1896)  Father of Wallis Simpson, Duchess of Windsor. Wife of Prince Edward Duke of Windsor.
William Pinkney Whyte (1824–1908), Maryland State Delegate, State Comptroller, a United States Senator, the State Governor, the Mayor of Baltimore, and State Attorney General.
Joseph Pere Bell Wilmer (1812–1878), Episcopal bishop of Louisiana.
John H. Winder (1800–1865), Confederate general during the American Civil War.

References

External links

Green Mount Cemetery at The Political Graveyard
Green Mount Cemetery Famous People Map Grave Marker Locations
Green Mount Cemetery at Explore Baltimore Heritage
Photos of Green Mount Cemetery on Flickr
Green Mount Cemetery at Cold Marble
Plan, Prospectus, and Terms, for the Establishment of a Public Cemetery, at the City of Baltimore (1838)

Cemeteries in Baltimore
Cemeteries on the National Register of Historic Places in Baltimore
Greenmount West, Baltimore
1838 establishments in Maryland
Rural cemeteries
Baltimore City Landmarks